Abdón Reyes Cardozo (born October 15, 1981, in Tarija) is a Bolivian football midfielder who plays most recently played for San José.

Club career
Reyes began his career in 2005 with newly promoted team Universitario de Sucre; however, he wasn't given the opportunity to play during the entire season. In 2006, he transferred to Club San José, where his career took off. Reyes demonstrated  to be a quality player, and it took popular club Bolívar nearly two years to realized the tremendous potential he had and signed him for the 2008 season.

International career
During 2008 he received his first call-up to the senior national team. His debut occurred on June 14, 2008, at home against Chile for the World Cup qualifiers. He has earned a total of 13 caps and represented his country in 9 FIFA World Cup qualification matches.

Honours

References

External links

1985 births
Living people
People from Tarija
Association football midfielders
Bolivian footballers
Bolivia international footballers
Universitario de Sucre footballers
Club Bolívar players
Club San José players